Events in the year 1951 in Mexico.

Incumbents

Federal government
 President: Miguel Alemán Valdés
 Interior Secretary (SEGOB): Adolfo Ruiz Cortines
 Secretary of Foreign Affairs (SRE): Manuel Tello Baurraud/Luis Padilla Nervo
 Communications Secretary (SCT): Agustín García López
 Education Secretary (SEP): Manuel Gual Vidal
 Secretary of Defense (SEDENA): Gilberto R. Limón
 Secretary of Navy: Alberto J. Pawling
 Secretary of Labor and Social Welfare: Manuel Ramírez Vázquez

Supreme Court

 President of the Supreme Court: Salvador Urbina

Governors
 Aguascalientes: Edmundo Gámez Orozco
 Campeche: Manuel López Hernández
 Chiapas: Francisco J. Grajales
 Chihuahua: Oscar Soto Maynez
 Coahuila: Raúl López Sánchez/Ramón Cepeda López
 Colima: Jesús González Lugo
 Durango: Enrique Torres Sánchez
 Guanajuato: José Aguilar y Maya
 Guerrero: Baltazar R. Leyva Mancilla/Alejandro Gómez Maganda
 Hidalgo: Vicente Aguirre del Castillo/Vicente Aguirre del Castillo
 Jalisco: José de Jesús González Gallo
 State of Mexico: Alfredo del Mazo Vélez/Salvador Sánchez Colín
 Michoacán: Dámaso Cárdenas del Río
 Morelos: Ernesto Escobar Muñoz
 Nayarit: Gilberto Flores Muñoz
 Nuevo León: Ignacio Morones Prieto
 Oaxaca: Manuel Mayoral Heredia
 Puebla: Carlos I. Betancourt/Rafael Ávila Camacho
 Querétaro:  Octavio Mondragón Guerra 
 San Luis Potosí: Ismael Salas Penieres
 Sinaloa: Enrique Pérez Arce 
 Sonora: Ignacio Soto
 Tabasco: Francisco Javier Santamaría
 Tamaulipas: Raúl Garate/Horacio Terán
 Tlaxcala: Rafael Avila Bretón/Felipe Mazarraza	 
 Veracruz: Marco Antonio Muñoz Turnbull
 Yucatán: José González Beytia/Humberto Esquivel Medina
 Zacatecas: José Minero Roque

Events

 The Faustino Miranda Botanical Garden is founded  under the trusteeship of Dr. Faustino Miranda. 
 March 9: The Mexico City trolleybus system starts operating.

Film

 List of Mexican films of 1951

Sport

 1950–51 Mexican Primera División season.
 Azules de Veracruz México win the Mexican League.
 November 12: C.F. La Piedad founded.

Births
January 6 – Fishman (wrestler) (d. 2017)
January 31 — Manuel Ángel Núñez Soto, Governor of Hidalgo 1999-2005
April 8 – Joan Sebastian, singer-songwriter (7 Latin Grammy Awards and 5 Grammy Awards, (d. July 13, 2015)
August 11 – Carlos Alvarado Perea, progressive rock musician (d. January 13, 2020)
August 14 — Dulce María Sauri Riancho, politician (PRI); first female Governor of Yucatán Governor of Yucatán
November 26 – Óscar Lara Aréchiga, politician (PRI) (d. 2017).
 December 27 – Ernesto Zedillo, economist and politician (PRI); 54th President of Mexico (1994-2000)
Date unknown
Emilio Alvarado Badillo, photographer, civil engineer, public servant and académic (ITESM, State of Mexico) (d. 2017).
Saúl Montoya Beltrán, baseball player; (d. 2018).
Curro Rivera Agüero, bullfighter; (d. 2001).

References

 
Mexico